Brewster is an English occupational surname, indicating a female involved in brewing. Notable people with the surname include:
 Anna Brewster (born 1986), English actress and model
 Benjamin Brewster (disambiguation), many people
 Caleb Brewster (1747–1827), American spy
 Chauncey B. Brewster (1848-1941) - fifth Bishop of the Episcopal Diocese of Connecticut.
 Cora Belle Brewster (1859–?), American physician, surgeon, medical writer, editor
 Craig Brewster (born 1966), Scottish footballer
 Daniel Brewster (1923–2007), American politician
 David Brewster (disambiguation), many people
 Diane Brewster (1931–1991), American actress
 Elizabeth Brewster (1922–2012), Canadian poet
 Ethel Hampson Brewster (1886-1947), American educator and philologist
 Few Brewster (1889–1957), Justice of the Supreme Court of Texas
 Flora A. Brewster (1852-1919), American physician, surgeon
 Harlan Carey Brewster (1870–1918), Canadian politician
 Henry Percy Brewster (1816–1884), American lawyer and statesman
 James C. Brewster (1826–1909), co-founder of the Church of Christ (Brewsterite)
 Janet Huntington Brewster (1910–1998), American philanthropist
 John Brewster (disambiguation), many people
 Jordana Brewster (born 1980), American actress
 June Brewster (1913–1995), American actress
 Kent Brewster (born 1961)
 Kingman Brewster Jr. (1919–1988), American educator and diplomat
 Lamon Brewster (born 1973), American professional boxer
 Lincoln Brewster (born 1971), American musician
 Love Brewster, Mayflower passenger
 Martha Wadsworth Brewster (1710–c.1757), American poet and writer
 Paget Brewster (born 1969), American actress
 Pete Brewster (1930–2020), American football player
 Ralph Owen Brewster (1888–1961), American politician
 Rhian Brewster (born 2000), English footballer
 Rudi M. Brewster (1932–2012), American federal judge
 Stephen Singer-Brewster (born 1945), American astronomer
 Tim Brewster (born 1960), American football player and coach
 Todd Brewster, American print and television journalist
 Tom Brewster (born 1974), Scottish curler
 W. Herbert Brewster (1897–1987), African-American minister and songwriter
 Wally Brewster (born 1960), formally James Walter Brewster Jr., U.S. businessman and diplomat
 William Brewster (disambiguation), many people
 Wrestling Brewster, Mayflower passenger
 Yvonne Brewster (born 1938), Jamaican-born stage director, teacher and writer

Television 
 Penelope "Punky" Brewster, the fictional character of the television series Punky Brewster
 Tom Brewster, the fictional lead character of the television series Sugarfoot

English-language surnames
Occupational surnames
English-language occupational surnames